Laimbu (26 January 1612 – 23 June 1646) was a Manchu noble of the early Qing Dynasty.

Biography
Laimbu was born of the Manchu Aisin Gioro clan as the 13th son of Nurhaci, founder of the Qing Dynasty. His mother was Lady Sirin Gioro (西林覺羅氏), a concubine of Nurhaci. He was a younger half-brother of Nurhaci's successor Hong Taiji.

In 1634, during Hong Taiji's reign, Laimbu was appointed as Niuluzhangjing (牛錄章京) and in 1639 he was given a position in the Deliberative Council of Princes and Ministers. In 1642 he followed his older half-brother Ajige to attack the Ming Dynasty and defeated a Ming army at Ningyuan. Ajige returned to his residence without waiting for an announcement of the rewards granted to him by Hong Taiji in recognition of his contributions. This was seen as showing disrespect towards the emperor. Laimbu was also found guilty because he did not stop Ajige, and was stripped of his position in the council.

In 1645 Laimbu was granted the title of "General Who Receives Grace" (奉恩將軍). He died in 1646 and his title was inherited by his son Laihu (來祜). In 1653, during the reign of the Shunzhi Emperor, Laimbu was conferred a posthumous title of "Duke Jiezhi Who Assists the Nation" (輔國介直公). The ducal title "Duke Who Assists the Nation" (輔國公) was then passed on to Laimbu's son Laihu.

Family 
Primary Consort

 Primary consort, of the Nara clan
 Laihu, Duke of the Second Rank (1625–1694), first son

Concubine

 Mistress, of the Fuca clan
 Mistress, of the Khorchin Borjigin clan
 Mistress of the Yang clan

Ancestry

See also
 Qing Dynasty nobility
 Ranks of Imperial Consorts in China#Qing

References

1612 births
1646 deaths
Nurhaci's sons
Deliberative Princes and Ministers
Manchu Plain Blue Bannermen